KWXT 1490 AM is a radio station licensed to Dardanelle, Arkansas. The station broadcasts a Southern Gospel format and is owned by Bradford Caldwell, through licensee Caldwell Media, LLC.

References

External links
KWXT's official website

Southern Gospel radio stations in the United States
Radio stations established in 1987
1987 establishments in Arkansas
WXT
Dardanelle, Arkansas